Vijayabahu V was the last King of Dambadeniya in the 14th century, who reigned from 1325/26 to 1344/45. He succeeded Bhuvanaikabahu III as King of Dambadeniya and was succeeded by Bhuvanaikabahu IV, King of Gampola.

See also
 List of Sri Lankan monarchs
 History of Sri Lanka

References

External links
 Kings & Rulers of Sri Lanka
 Codrington's Short History of Ceylon

Monarchs of Dambadeniya
House of Siri Sanga Bo
V
V